King Randor is a fictional character, a warrior king who appears in the popular 1980s Masters of the Universe franchise. In early material, the character is called King Miro; this was later given in the Filmation cartoon series as King Randor's long-lost father's name.

Character history

Filmation animated series/Original toy line
Randor is the good and noble King of Eternia, and the father of the series' hero He-Man, or rather his alter ego, Prince Adam, and (introduced later) Princess Adora, a.k.a. She-Ra. He is often annoyed and disappointed by Adam's seeming laziness and reluctance to take any real responsibility.  Not realizing his son's dual identity, he is still very proud of his honest and kind-hearted son. Sometimes he is shown trying to teach his son lessons, as presumably Adam will one day become King. Although Skeletor, the line's main villain, is initially said to be "from another dimension", later on in the original line it is heavily implied, but never officially confirmed, that Randor's long-lost half-brother Keldor became Skeletor. However, the writer of "The Search for Keldor", the minicomic in question, has since confirmed that this was the intent. In the 2002 series, Keldor also becomes Skeletor, although through different circumstances, and there is no acknowledgement that Keldor is Randor's half-brother.

Randor appears regularly in the original series, but it is uncommon for him to be directly involved in the action. However, he features heavily in the storyline of the episode "Prince Adam No More", in which he displays both his love for his son and his prowess at battling Skeletor's robots. The rest of the 1980s incarnation of the franchise mostly sticks with Filmation's version of a bold, middle-aged, brown-haired king, but some of the franchise's other material presents him as a much older, white haired, almost wizened ruler.

The New Adventures of He-Man
King Randor appears alongside Queen Marlena in the first episode of The New Adventures of He-Man series. Before Adam leaves to travel to the future, he visits his parents and tells them of his mission. Randor watches in amazement as Adam transforms into He-Man before his eyes, and tells his son he is very proud of him. Randor is one of the few characters to appear in both the original series and The New Adventures, and his costume and voice are very accurate to his original portrayal.

Mike Young Productions animated series
In the 2002 Mike Young Productions remake, it is made apparent that in his youth, Randor was known as Captain Randor, a brave and steadfast warrior before being crowned King of Eternia by the Elders, although in the 1983 series, he is portrayed as having taken over the throne after his father, King Miro, disappeared. He even aids the Masters in a couple of episodes in their battles against Skeletor and his Evil Warriors and even the Snake Men. Apparently, after King Grayskull's death, the Council of Elders was formed to rule Eternia. But after Keldors' transformation, into Skeletor they made Randor king as they became one with Castle Grayskull. 

He is also tied more closely to the origin of Skeletor, having battled Skeletor when he was still Keldor during a war the Eternians call The Great Unrest. That war ended when Keldor and his forces attacked the Hall of Wisdom, home of the Elders, and Keldor and Randor engaged in a deadly duel that ended with Keldor hurling acid at Randor, only to have Randor deflect the acid with his shield, splashing the acid back at Keldor and burning his face, which led to his transformation into Skeletor. It is revealed by a writer that in this continuity Keldor and Randor are half-brothers, but it is never revealed if either knew that.

After the Council of Evil incident, King Randor established an Eternian Council consisting of himself; Chief Carnivus of the Qadians; Lord Dactys of the Speleans; King Chooblah of the Kulataks; Queen Andreeno of the Andreenids; King Taurius of the Mintaurans; Hawk, representing the Avions, and some other unnamed council members. Although in the 2002 edition, he is not aware of his son being He-Man, it may be explained that Adam inherited the inherent skills to become He-Man through the inward bravery of Captain Randor.

King Randor will appear in the Live Action He-Man movie. In the film, he will be presented as the great warrior-king of Eternia, a descendant of the Grayskulls, and the father of Adam and step-father to human Keldor rather being his half-brother.

Toyline
In the original toy-line, despite featuring very much throughout the franchise's run, there was no King Randor figure until a surprise sudden release as part of the final wave. As the final wave was generally produced in less quantity due to sales gradually dipping, the figure is one of the much rarer and more hunted of the original line. 

The 2002 revamped line was discontinued before a new King Randor figure could be produced; however, there was a NECA-produced statue, an action figure-sized piece with no movable joints. His wife Queen Marlena, never had an action figure version released in either the original or revamped line, although she would finally receive one in the Masters of the Universe Classics line as a San Diego ComiCon exclusive in 2011, that had interchangeable parts so she could also appear in her astronaut persona "Captain Glenn".

In December 2009, a King Randor figure, mostly inspired by the original 1980s figure, was released as part of the Masters of the Universe Classics line. In November 2012, a second King Randor figure, subtitled "Eternos Palace", was released in the Masters of the Universe Classics line, this time designed to resemble the character as he appeared in the Filmation cartoon.

References

Fictional characters introduced in 1983
Masters of the Universe Heroic Warriors
Randor
Fictional soldiers
Fictional swordfighters
Male characters in animated series